Tamola is an unincorporated community in Kemper County, in the U.S. state of Mississippi.

History
Tamola is a name derived from the Choctaw language purported to mean "to scatter". A variant name is "Tamola Station".

Tamola is located on the Kansas City Southern Railway. The station in Tamola was the first railroad station in Kemper County and was built in 1858. A post office operated under the name Tamola Station from 1858 to 1879 and under the name Tamola from 1903 to 1924.

Tamola was once home to a Catholic church of the Diocese of Natchez and was served by clergy from Meridian.

References

Unincorporated communities in Mississippi
Unincorporated communities in Kemper County, Mississippi
Mississippi placenames of Native American origin